Arini may refer to:

 Arini (tribe), a tribe within the neotropical parrots
 Arini, a Csángó village in Găiceana Commune, Bacău County, Romania
 Arini, a village in Măieruș Commune, Braşov County, Romania
 Arini, Elis, a village in Elis, Greece

See also

Ariniș